ATS (Auto Technisches Spezialzubehör) is a German company that manufactures alloy wheels for road and racing cars. It is based in Bad Dürkheim near the Hockenheimring race circuit. ATS had a Formula One racing team that was active from 1977 to 1984.

Wheel manufacturer

ATS was founded in 1969, specialising in lightweight wheels for Porsche, VW and Mercedes-Benz automobiles. ATS manufactured the "Penta" wheel used by Mercedes tuning company AMG from 1979 into the 1980s.

Formula One team
ATS owner Günter Schmid had sponsored various national motorsport events, before realising Grand Prix racing was an ideal way of promoting his brand. Due to his temper, Schmid was difficult to work with, and the F1 team had a high turnover of staff.

The 1970s
In 1977, ATS purchased the remaining PC4 chassis from Penske Racing. Jean-Pierre Jarier was signed to drive the car, placing 6th on the team's debut at the United States Grand Prix West.

A second car was entered in the 1977 German Grand Prix for German touring car racer Hans Heyer. Heyer failed to qualify, but famously took the start anyway in front of his home crowd at the Hockenheimring. The race organisers only noticed when he retired with a broken gear linkage. Hans Binder would then take the second car for the rest of the season, though the team missed the final three races of the year.

Robin Herd from March Engineering was enlisted to build the first genuine ATS Formula One car, the HS1 being driven by Jarier and Jochen Mass. Jarier came 8th at the South African Grand Prix, but was fired after an argument with Schmidt, and replaced by Alberto Colombo for the Belgian Grand Prix. After two failures to qualify, Colombo was also fired, and replaced by Keke Rosberg until the German Grand Prix. There, Jarier returned, having patched up his differences with Schmid, only for them to re-emerge following Jarier's failure to qualify. Binder returned for one race, before Michael Bleekemolen took over.

By now Mass had also left following a broken leg in testing. As Harald Ertl had failed to pre-qualify his Ensign for the 1978 Italian Grand Prix, he was given another chance with the first ATS. Ertl didn't qualify for the race, and Rosberg returned for the final two races. The lack of continuity both in the cars and in the garage had been no help to the fledgling team, despite the introduction of the new D1 chassis. The D1 was designed by John Gentry, and featured skirts, wider track and side pods.
The D1 was used in the last two races of the 1978 season.

1979 saw Hans-Joachim Stuck arrive, to drive a single car. The new Giacomo Caliri-designed D2 arrived mid-season but it was an ill-handling car, with Stuck taking the team's only points score of the season with 5th place at the United States Grand Prix in another new car, the D3, courtesy of Nigel Stroud.

The 1980s
The team stepped up to a two-car operation again in 1980, with Marc Surer and Jan Lammers signed to drive the D3. Surer took 7th at the Brazilian Grand Prix, while Lammers started 4th before retiring at the United States Grand Prix West, but the team were still distinct midfielders, even after the introduction of the new Gustav Brunner-penned D4. From the US GP West, they were back down to a single car, with Surer injured, though he returned in the French Grand Prix, this time replacing Lammers. Once again, though, the team failed to score points.

1981 saw Lammers recalled to drive a single D4, with a second fielded for Slim Borgudd for the San Marino Grand Prix. After this, Lammers was dropped once more, with Borgudd driving the single entry.  The Swede took 6th place at the high-attrition British Grand Prix, the D4 having by now been replaced by the HGS1, designed by Hervé Guilpin, but otherwise results were poor, and non-qualifications frequent. This was the year where Swedish pop band ABBA sponsored the team. In fact, Slim Borgudd had appeared on some ABBA recordings as a drummer.

Schmid made a major effort to get the team together for 1982. Two D5 cars (a heavily upgraded version of the HGS1) were fielded for Manfred Winkelhock and Eliseo Salazar. This brought better results, with Winkelhock 5th at the Brazilian Grand Prix and Salazar 5th at the San Marino Grand Prix (Winkelhock would have taken 6th at this race, boycotted by most British teams due to a political crisis within the sport, but his car was underweight). While the team were improving, they were midfielders more than anything else. Indeed, the team's most high-profile moment came when Salazar was attacked by Nelson Piquet on live television at the German Grand Prix, the ATS driver having collided with the race-leading Brazilian while being lapped.

BMW engines

However, Schmid used his muscle in the German auto industry to secure a supply of BMW's powerful BMW M12/13 4-cylinder turbocharged engine for 1983. ATS fielded a single new Gustav Brunner D6 for Winkelhock. There were some excellent qualifying positions and races from the German, but the constant turnover of backroom staff meant that reliability issues were never solved, and 8th place at the European Grand Prix was his best result.

For 1984, Brunner's new D7 chassis was introduced, but it was largely the same story, with not inconsiderable speed rarely rewarded, not helped by Brunner quitting after, predictably, yet another an argument with Schmid. Winkelhock ran 3rd at the Belgian Grand Prix before the electrical system failed, but his best finishes were 8th places in the Canadian Grand Prix and the Dallas Grand Prix. From the Austrian Grand Prix, a second D7 was added for Gerhard Berger. After a gearbox failure on the grid at the Italian Grand Prix, Winkelhock finally lost patience and quit. In the race, Berger placed 6th, but the point was not awarded as the second entry had not been registered at the start of the season. Berger entered the last two races alone, with Winkelhock not replaced.

At the end of the year, BMW revoked the use of their engines due to the bad PR the team and its owner generated, and Schmid folded the ATS team and left the ATS company.

Comeback with Rial

Complete Formula One World Championship results
(key) (Results in bold indicate pole position; results in italics indicate fastest lap.) 

* Started illegally, having failed to qualify.
† Ineligible for points.

References

External links

ATS website with Motorsport history

Formula One constructors
Formula One entrants
German auto racing teams
German racecar constructors
Companies based in Rhineland-Palatinate
1977 establishments in West Germany
1984 disestablishments in West Germany
Auto racing teams established in 1977
Auto racing teams disestablished in 1984